This is a list of currently available photographic films in a still camera film format. This includes recently discontinued films that remain available from stock at main suppliers. Films are listed by brand name. Still camera photographic films no longer in production (or available) are included in the list of discontinued photographic films. Films for movie making are included in the list of motion picture film stocks.

P - Polyester base; T- Triacetate base; SUC-27/39 - Single use camera with 27/39 exposures.

ADOX

The current rights to the historic ADOX name were obtained in 2003 by Fotoimpex of Berlin, Germany, a company founded in 1992 to import photographic films and papers from the former Eastern Bloc. ADOX (Fotoimpex) subsequently established a film factory in Bad Sarrow outside Berlin to convert and package films, papers and chemicals. In February 2015 they acquired use of the former Ilford Imaging (Ciba Geigy) machine E, medium scale coating line at Marly, Switzerland. From 2017 to 2018 they doubled the size of the Bad Sarrow factory to be able to install film coating capability (still in progress in 2021) and medium scale photochemistry manufacture.

The ADOX name traces back to the oldest photographic film manufacturer in the world, started in 1860 in Germany. In the 1970s, Dupont the owners of the Adox brand sold the recipes and machinery of their B&W films to Fotokemika in Croatia who continued to produce the films under the Efke brand. The films were subsequently imported by Fotoimpex and sold as ADOX CHS Art thus re-uniting the ADOX name with the films. After Fotokemikas closure in 2012, ADOX CHS II was produced for ADOX using modern cascade coating and since then the range of products has been expanded.

Black and white negative films

Black and white reversal (slide) films

Colour negative films

Agfa-Gevaert
Agfa-Gevaert is headquartered in Mortsel, Belgium and following the sale of its consumer films division (See AgfaPhoto), now only manufactures commercial films; 'Aviphot' for aerial photography and 'Copex' archival microfilms (since 2013 Copex films are branded 'Imagelink' for Eastman Park Micrographics). Some of these films are however repackaged for consumer use by Maco under its Rollei brand and by Japan Camera Hunter, Silberra and ADOX.

AgfaPhoto
The AGFA consumer film division with its plant in Leverkusen, Germany was spun off by Agfa-Gevaert into a new company AGFA PHOTO in 2004. At buy out the firm was split into a holding company Agfa-Photo Holding GMBH (licenses) and manufacturing company Agfa-Photo GMBH (leverkusen). The manufacturing company went bankrupt in 7 months resulting in the closure of the Leverkusen plant in 2005. The holding company was unaffected and retains a trademark license from Agfa-Gevaert for the use of the AgfaPhoto brand and 'red dot' logo on products having a photographic application. Since 2005 these rights for consumer film products have been sub-licensed to Lupus Imaging & Media. The colour negative and slide films were made by Ferrania from 2005, whilst black and white films were converted by Ferrania from stored master rolls of AGFA stock. Ferrania closed in 2009. Replacement colour films were supplied by Fujifilm until this contract ended in early 2018, ending the sale of colour film under the AgfaPhoto brand. Black & White films were replaced by new films made by Harman Technology after 2013.

Argenti 
Based in Gijón, Spain, Argenti offer a small range of B&W films, converted from bulk in their own packaging.

Arista EDU 
Arista EDU Ultra is a budget range of Black & White films produced for Freestyle Photographic, USA in three speeds (ISO 100, 200, 400) in 135, 120 and sheet film formats. They are currently the same as the equivalent speed films produced by FOMA. 135 films are not DX coded.

Bergger 
Based in France Bergger was established in 1995 and offers a single B&W film manufactured on their behalf; Panchro 400 introduced in 2015 replacing BRF400.

CatLABS 
CatLABS is a photographic retailer in Boston, USA. Two own branded films were launched in 2019.

Cinestill 
Based in USA Cinestill was established in 2012 and converts Eastman Kodak motion picture stock into 135 and 120 still camera formats. Colour stock is suitable for C-41 process as it is missing the normal Remjet backing, a separate lubricating and Anti-halation backing used to protect the film in motion picture cameras. This means that the films lack the normal anti-halation layer also found in still camera film resulting in a characteristic 'glow' in highlights due to the internal reflection back through the film in the camera.

Black and white films

Colour negative films

dubblefilm 
A range of 'creative' colour films launched in 2017 in conjunction with mobile app 'dubble'. The films were produced by KONO! a small European analogue photographic company based in Austria. In 2019 they announced a tie up with Revelog also in Austria, films will now offer 36 exp, effects are improved and some films were renamed.

Black and white films

Color negative films

Ferrania 
FILM Ferrania s.r.l. is a photographic film manufacturing company located in Ferrania (Liguria), Italy. Following closure of the original Ferrania factory in 2009 the company was re-founded in 2013 following a kickstarter campaign and support from the regional government to build a new film manufacturing base using the former Ferrania research laboratory (L.R.F.) and its narrow coater. Although initial plans focused on re-introducing a colour slide film, FILM Ferrania commenced manufacturing a B&W still film in February 2017 based on P30, a classic 1960s motion picture film stock, being a simpler proposition. Production of the P30 'Alpha' ceased in mid 2018 due to further works to the L.R.F building and need to refine production to reduce wastage and P30 production did not recommence until late 2019.

Film Photography Project 
Established in 2009 by Michael Raso, Film Photography Project (FPP) sources a variety of still films including those originally made for technical, motion pictures, industrial or aerial applications for creative purposes.

Black and white films

Color negative films

Color reversal (slide) films

Film Washi 
Factory in Saint-Nazaire, France. Launched in 2013, producing a handcrafted B&W film, handcoated on traditional Washi paper. Also converting other B&W films industrially coated in larger factories and originally made for technical, motion pictures, industrial or aerial applications for creative purposes.

Black and white films

Flic Film 
Located in Alberta, Canada, Flic Film packages 35mm cinema film from Eastman Kodak and Orwo into cassettes for stills photography and also produces its own house brand photo chemicals. The film is rolled by machine directly from 1000 foot reels and finished with a machine cut leader.

Black and white films

Foma Bohemia 
Foma Bohemia spol. s.r.o, established 1921 with factory located in Hradec Králové, Czech Republic, remains one of the last traditional producers of panchromatic B&W (black and white) photo materials including films, papers and chemistry. Films branded as Arista EDU also come from this source.

Black and white films

Black and white reversal (slide) films

FOTOIMPEX 
FOTOIMPEX of Berlin, Germany, is a company founded in 1992 to import photographic films and papers from the former Eastern Bloc. They acquired the rights to the ADOX name in 2003. However two films are still sold under their own name, both Black & White films produced by Harman Technology.

FUJIFILM
FUJIFILM is a Japanese manufacturer of photographic films, chemistry, papers and cameras established in 1934. Although now a diversified company they are one of only two remaining manufacturers (with Kodak) of colour film. The film range currently comprises: Consumer films; FujiColor/ FujiColor Superia and Professional films; Neopan, Velvia and Provia. FujiColor Pro professional color negative films were discontinued in 2021. Instax is a range of instant films and cameras launched in 1998 which now outsell the traditional products. Fujifilm distribution depends on worldwide region with a number of Japan specific products sometimes available as Parallel imports.

Black and white films

Color negative films

Color reversal (slide) films

Instant films
These are marketed by format, rather than emulsion.

Holga
The Holga is a low cost plastic medium format 120 film camera, made in Hong Kong, known for its low-fidelity aesthetic. A Holga branded B&W film stock is produced by FOMA.

ILFORD
Harman Technology trading as Ilford Photo is a UK manufacturer of photographic materials based in Mobberley, Cheshire known worldwide for its ILFORD branded black and white films, papers and chemicals. ILFORD films are also produced in larger than usual sizes by annual special order,  including sheet films in various sizes up to 16 by 20 inches, and bulk roll films in 90mm, 5 inch and 10 inch widths. They also produce Kentmere branded film and Harman branded single use and reloadable cameras sold with Ilford or Kentmere films. The company additionally undertakes contract coating and/or conversion/packaging of B&W films for other brands.  (Note the ILFORD brand is also shared with Ilford Imaging Europe, a remnant of the former Swiss arm of the company, whose products include a disposable colour film camera, but other than a common heritage, there is now no connection between the two companies).

Black and white films

Japan Camera Hunter 
Bellamy Hunt is a camera collector and runs the website Japan Camera Hunter. He released his own branded film in 2016, using a B&W traffic surveillance film manufactured by Agfa Gevaert.

Kentmere 
Kentmere is a brand of classic grain B&W films introduced in 2009 and produced by Harman Technology in Mobberley, Cheshire, UK. Originally designed as a lower priced brand to their Ilford offer to compete in the US market they are now available worldwide. Similar films are also made by Harman Technology for the Agfaphoto, Oriental and Rollei brands. The name is derived from the Kentmere based photographic paper brand acquired by Ilford in 2007 and the films are particularly aimed at the student market and those new to black and white photography, due to their lower cost and 'forgiving' exposure latitude. Film names and packaging were revised in 2018. On 1st December 2022, 120 format film was added to the range.

Kodak

Kodak is a USA manufacturer of photographic films established in 1888 and one of only two manufacturers (with Fujifilm) still producing colour film. Kodak films for still cameras are manufactured by Eastman Kodak in Rochester, New York, USA but since its Chapter 11 bankruptcy in 2012 are now sold and marketed by Kodak Alaris, a separate company controlled by the Kodak UK Pension fund based in Hertfordshire, UK. The film range is divided into Consumer films, (ColorPlus and Gold/Ultramax) and Professional films, (Tri-X, T-MAX, Ektar, Portra and Ektachrome). Kodak continues to invest in film with 2018 seeing the re-introduction of two films, TMAX P3200 and Ektachrome. A wider range of sheet film sizes for some products are available by a group buying scheme managed for Kodak Alaris by Canham Cameras, USA.

Black and white films

Color negative films

Color reversal (slide) films

KONO! 
Launched in 2014, KONO! is a small European analogue photographic company based in Austria that produces a range of 'creative' 35mm format films. Most KONO! films are based on stock originally intended for shooting motion pictures, scientific purposes or other places photosensitive emulsions were used. All films are hand rolled onto recycled 135 film cassettes. Kono! also produced creative films for the 'dubblefilm' brand until early 2019.

Black and white films

Color negative films

Kosmo Foto 
Stephen Dowling runs the website Kosmo Foto (Previously Zorki Photo, renamed because the name Zorki was still being used in Russia). He released his own branded B&W film in 2017, supplied by Foma Bohemia, the packaging of which is noted for its bold Soviet-era inspired artwork, with a second film added in 2021.

Lomography
Headquarters in Vienna, Austria. Lomography is a globally-active organization dedicated to analogue, experimental and creative photography. Lomography procures films from film manufacturers to sell under the lomography brand. They uniquely offer film in 110 format.

Black and white films

Color negative films 
Colour films 100, 400, 800 are thought to be based on Kodacolor VR formulations from the mid-1980s. All currently manufactured by Kodak in USA.

Color reversal (slide) films 
Although made for cross processing in C-41 process chemistry these films will provide normal slides if E-6 processed.

Oriental 
Oriental is a Japanese brand of photographic films and papers owned by Cyber Graphics Co, Tokyo. The photographic films are produced by Harman Technology, UK and are similar to the Kentmere films. They were developed as a budget B&W film for the Japanese market.

ORWO 
ORWO is a brand of black and white film products, made in Germany. Once part of AGFA, the partition of Germany saw the company divided, the East German company becoming VEB Film und Chemiefaserwerk Agfa Wolfen, which later adopted the brand ORWO (ORiginal WOlfen) in 1964. The company was privatised in 1990 as ORWO AG, but film production ceased in 1994 following the liquidation of the company. One of the successor companies, ORWO FilmoTec GmbH was founded in 1998 to produce high quality black and white cinema and technical films, based in Wolfen including the Camera films UN54 and N75 (List of motion picture film stocks) which are widely re-packaged for still film use. In 2020 FilmoTec was brought under common ownership with film manufacturer InovisCoat GmbH, also based in Germany to offer products for the film industry under the traditional brand “ORWO”. In 2022 they announced the introduction of a still camera black and white film under their own brand. Subsequently, a new C-41 Colour film was announced.

Black and white negative films

Colour negative films

Polaroid
Polaroid B.V. is a Dutch photography company that was founded in 2008 as the 'Impossible Project' to re-introduce instant film for Polaroid cameras. Impossible bought the production machinery from Polaroid for $3.1 million and leased a building, called Building Noord, which was formerly part of the Polaroid plant in Enschede, Netherlands but had to re-invent the emulsions and processes. Polaroid Corporation's brand and intellectual property were acquired by Impossible Project's largest shareholder in 2017 and the company was later renamed 'Polaroid Originals' before becoming 'Polaroid' in 2020. Based in Enschede, Polaroid manufactures film for its own and selected original Polaroid instant cameras. Instant films are marketed by format rather than emulsion.

Rera 
Rera is a brand of photographic film for 127 (4x4) format roll film cameras assembled in Japan by Kawauso-Shoten. Film is converted for 127 format and sold through main retailers.

Black & White film

Color negative film

Color reversal (slide) film

Revolog 
Revolog is a small company based in Vienna, Austria which re-manufactures and sells a range of creative 'special effects' still camera films. Revolog take standard ISO 200 color film in 135 format and pre-expose the rolls with a unique effect. In 2019 they also re-manufacture creative films for dubblefilm.

Black and white films

Color negative films

Rollei
The Rollei brand for photographic film is licensed to Maco (Hans O. Mahn GmbH & Co. KG, Maco Photo Products) a German-based supplier of photographic films. Headquarters in Stapelfeld, Germany. They offer a range of polyester* base black and white and colour films originally for aerial photography produced by Agfa-Gevaert and converted by Maco for still camera use and general purpose triacetate base RPX 100/400 black and white films from Harman Technology / Ilford Photo. (Note: Polyester base films must be loaded in subdued light to avoid light piping effect).

Black and white films

Color negative films

Color reversal (slide) films

SFL
Sreda film lab is based in Moscow, Russia. These films are repackaged from bulk rolls into 35mm cassettes or 120 rolls by Sreda for still camera use. Film is packaged with distinctive original artwork. 120 films are wrapped in silver foil.

Black and white films

Color negative films

Shanghai 
The Shanggong Shanghai Photosensitive material factory (formerly Shanghai ShenBei photosensitive material factory), was established in 1958 in Shanghai, China producing a black and white film primarily for domestic production as well as X-ray materials. Production was interrupted in 2015–6 due to new factory construction. It is part of the Shanggong group conglomerate. In 2019, 135 film was announced under the Shanghai name by a new company and photographic wholesaler Shanghai Jiancheng Technology Ltd that has acquired the rights to the name and companies assets, but initially appears to be re-packaged ORWO product. Formats uniquely include 220 and 620 medium format film.

Silberra 
The company based in Saint Petersburg, Russia was founded in 2009 producing analog film products. It adopted the Silberra name in 2017 to introduce a range of Black & white films. Funding was sought through an indiegogo crowdfunding campaign to launch six new films. Three panchromatic films are available from launch based on Agfa-Gevaert Aviphot products. Two orthochromatic films were added in 2018. Silberra also offer cinema film from ORWO and Kodak in 135 cassettes for still use
Фотопленки

Black and white films

Color negative films

SPUR 
SPUR (Speed Photography & Ultra high Resolution) is a supplier of own brand specialist photochemistry and films based in Langerwehe, Germany. Two black & white films produced by Agfa-Gevaert are sold under their own brand.

Svema (Astrum) 
Founded in Soviet times in 1931, the Svema film factory and chemical plant in Shostka, Ukraine was once the second largest film producer in Europe. Final coating of X-ray films occurred in 2003 and the plant closed completely in 2005. After attempts by the state to sell the business, bankruptcy processes were completed in 2015. The coating machinery was sold for scrap and the main buildings were demolished ca. 2018. However, a decade prior to closure, a small group of Svema employees had founded Astrum holdings in a rented building on the site in 1995, buying bulk film from various sources which they converted and packaged, for retail sale. Originally sold under the Astrum name (film expiring up to 2019), they later acquired rights to the Svema trademark and now apply the name to a range of films for nostalgic value. (Tasma for NK-2). The current range comprises polyester (thin) base films of the kind used for aerial/surveillance photography. Potential suppliers include Agfa-Gevaert and Tasma.

Black and white films
Svema   Микрофиш МА-10 4,8 iso

Color negative films

UltraFine 
UltraFine is the house trade brand of photo retailer Photo Warehouse of California, USA who has been producing own brand products since 1979. Photo Warehouse has historically offered three major Black and White Photo Films, Ultrafine Black and White Films 1979 to 2012, Ultrafine Plus Films 2002 to 2011, and Ultrafine Xtreme Films from 2008 to the present day. The current Xtreme films are manufactured by Harman Technology based on packaging and codes. Uniquely the 135 films are still offered in 12 exp cassettes.

VIBE
Film brand mainly sold in Asia, but can also be found on sale in Europe.

Black and white films

Color negative films

Yodica 
Yodica is a small company established in Milan, Italy in 2018, which produces and sells a range of creative 'special effects' still camera films. Yodica takes ISO 400 color film in 135 format and pre-expose the film with a unique effect. Films are not DX coded.

Color negative films

See also
 Photographic film
 List of discontinued photographic films
 List of motion picture film stocks
 List of photographic film formats
 Film format

References

External links
 Some facts and opinions about modern slow-speed high-resolution B&W films

Lists of photography topics